George Frederick Weston (2 February 1925 – 25 July 2009) was an English physicist and author. He is best known for his work associated with cold cathode glow discharge devices, and has published over a dozen papers and a book dealing with the subject. In 1956, Weston took leadership of a small group of physicists, investigating cold cathode tubes, which gained a reputation as one of the foremost research units in the field. George Weston has a MSc degree and is a Fellow of the Institute of Physics.

Early life 
George Weston was born in Catford, London, where he attended St. Dunstans College but later moved with his family to Reigate, Surrey due to the school's involvement in the World War II evacuation program.

References

Sources

External links

British physicists
1925 births
2009 deaths
Alumni of the University of London